Omar Estevez (born February 2, 1998) is a Cuban professional baseball shortstop who is a free agent.

Career
Estevez plated for Matanzas in the Cuban National Series as a 16-year old during the 2014–2015 season. He signed with the Dodgers as an international free agent in November 2015 for a $6 million bonus. He made his professional debut with the Great Lakes Loons of the Midwest League in 2016, hitting .255 in 122 games. Estevez was promoted to the Rancho Cucamonga Quakes of the California League, where he spent the 2017 and 2018 seasons. In 2019, he was promoted to the Tulsa Drillers of the Texas League and he hit .291 in 83 games with six homers and 36 RBI. He did not play in 2020 due to the cancellation of the minor league season as a result of the COVID-19 pandemic but in 2021 he was assigned to the Triple-A Oklahoma City Dodgers where he hit .199 in 106 games. He returned to Oklahoma City in 2022, and hit .216 in 52 games. He elected free agency on November 10, 2022.

References

External links

Living people
1998 births
Cuban baseball players
Baseball infielders
Minor league baseball players
Cocodrilos de Matanzas players
Great Lakes Loons players
Rancho Cucamonga Quakes players
Tulsa Drillers players
Arizona League Dodgers players
Glendale Desert Dogs players
Oklahoma City Dodgers players
Tomateros de Culiacán players
Leones de Ponce players